Kirkandrews-on-Eden or Kirkandrews-upon-Eden, in the past known as Kirkanders, is a village and former civil parish, now in the civil parish of Beaumont, in the Carlisle District of the county of Cumbria, England. The village is found 4 miles North-West of Carlisle. Kirkandrews forms part of the Barony of Burgh together with the nearby villages Monkhill, Grinsdale, Rattlingate and Burgh-by-Sands. The civil parish was merged into Beaumont in 1934. In 1931 the civil parish had a population of 145.

History
Hadrian's Wall Path and the Vallum run through the village. The village is 500m from the River Eden along which the Cumbrian Coastal Walk runs. It contains several examples of interesting listed buildings, Hollow Creek Farm; built in 1760, The Manor House, The Croft; built in the 1600s, The Beeches, Beech House are Grade II listed. National Cycle Network Route 72, Hadrian's Cycleway, stretches 160 miles along the Hadrian's Wall World Heritage Site from Ravenglass on the Cumbrian coast via Kirkandrews-on-Eden to Tynemouth near Newcastle upon Tyne.

The Church of St. Andrew, which formerly stood here and gave a name to the village, disappeared long ago, and nothing now remains to point out its site, save the undulations of the greensward and the well of St. Andrew found in the old graveyard. Since the year 1692, Kirkandrews has been united with Beaumont in all ecclesiastical matters, and St. Mary's Church at Beaumont and Beaumont Parish Hall in Kirkandrews serve for both parishes.

Transport
Evidence of the Carlisle Canal, later converted to the Carlisle to Silloth Railway, are to be found in the village and surrounding fields. Kirkandrews railway station was a victim of the 1964 Beeching cuts.

See also

Listed buildings in Beaumont, Cumbria

References

External links

 Cumbria County History Trust: Kirkandrews-on-Eden (nb: provisional research only – see Talk page)
 Kirkandrews upon Eden Tourist Information
 Burgh By Sands Parish Council
 Port Carlisle Railway - Towns and Villages
 Images Of Cumbria - Kirkandrews-on-Eden Parish
 Welcome to Ratlingate - Scout Activity Centre
 Living Magically - Holy Wells of Cumbria

Villages in Cumbria
Beaumont, Cumbria